Phlek Chhat is the former industry minister of Cambodia. He was also director general of the plan at the Ministry of Information.

Selected publications
 La Conquête de l'Indépendance Économique du Cambodge. Ministry of Information, Phnom Penh, 1964.

References

Living people
Year of birth missing (living people)
Cambodian politicians
Government ministers of Cambodia